Akarca is a village in Mersin Province, Turkey. It is a part of Mezitli district which is an intracity district of Greater Mersin. It is situated in the Taurus Mountains. In the vicinity of the village is a chromium mining site. The population was 512  as of 2012.

References

Villages in Mezitli District